

India

Poets (by date of birth)
 Thirukural (31-), Thiruvalluvar

Roman empire

Events
 8 - Exile of Ovid: Ovid is banished for the remainder of his life to Tomis on the Black Sea by personal intervention of the Emperor Augustus

Poets (by date of birth)
 Ovid (43BCE-17)
 Columella (4-70), Cadiz?
 Persius (34-62), Etruscan
 Quintilian (35-95)
 Lucan (Nov. 3, 39 - Apr. 3, 65), Hispania Baetica
 Statius (45-96), Naples
 Martial (86-103), Hispania

Dates not known:
 Caesius Bassus (died in Eruption of Mount Vesuvius in 79 (Aug. 24))
 Calpurnius, Sicily?
 Manilius
 Juvenal
 Sulpicia

Works
 Marcus Manilius (probable author), Astronomica (c. 10-20)
 Ovid, Tristia (c. 9-12) and Epistulae ex Ponto (c. 13-16)
 Statius, Thebaid (c. 90), Silvae (c. 93–96) and Achilleid (c. 94–96, unfinished)

China

Poets (by date of birth)
 Zhang Heng (78-139), Eastern Han
 Ban Gu (32-92)

Decades and years

References

 
Poetry
01